Ethminolia hemprichii is a species of minute sea snail, a marine gastropod mollusk or micromollusk in the family Trochidae, the top snails.

In 2008 this species was placed in the genus Ethminolia by Rusmore-Villaume.

Description
The height of the shell attains 2½  mm, its diameter also 2½ mm. The minute, umbilicate shell has an orbiculate-conoid shape. Under a lens it is longitudinally striate. It is shining, whitish, painted with oblique chestnut streaks, and spotted with brown. The apex is rather obtuse. The five whorls are regularly increasing, rather convex, and flattened at the distinctly impressed sutures. The body whorl scarcely equals half the total altitude. The base of the shell is rounded or obscurely subangular. The aperture has a quadrate-rounded shape. The simple peristome is acute. The columella is subtruncate at its base. The umbilicus is rather narrow and funnel-shaped.

Distribution
This species occurs in the Red Sea. It also occurs in the Mediterranean Sea off Israel as an introduced species.

References

 Savigny, J-.C., 1817 Description de l'Egypte, ou recueil des observations et des recherches qui ont été faites en Egypte pendant l'expédition de l'Armée française, publié par les ordres de sa Majesté l'Empereur Napoléon le Grand. Histoire Naturelle, p. 339 pp
 Bouchet, P. & Danrigal, F., 1982. Napoleon's Egyptian campaign (1798-1801) and the Savigny collection of shells. The Nautilus 96(1): 9-24
 Zuschin, M., Janssen, R. & Baal, C. (2009). Gastropods and their habitats from the northern Red Sea (Egypt: Safaga). Part 1: Patellogastropoda, Vetigastropoda and Cycloneritimorpha. Annalen des Naturhistorischen Museums in Wien 111[A]: 73–158.

External links
 
 Issel, A. (1869). Malacologia del Mar Rosso. Ricerche zoologiche e paleontologiche. Biblioteca Malacologica, Pisa. xi + 387 pp., pls 1-5.
 Janssen R. et al. (2009) Gastropods and their habitats from the northern Red Sea (Egypt: afaga)  Part 1: Patellogastropoda, Vetigastropoda and Cycloneritimorpha
 Katsanevakis, S.; Bogucarskis, K.; Gatto, F.; Vandekerkhove, J.; Deriu, I.; Cardoso A.S. (2012). Building the European Alien Species Information Network (EASIN): a novel approach for the exploration of distributed alien species data. BioInvasions Records. 1: 235-245.
 Zenetos, A.; Çinar, M.E.; Pancucci-Papadopoulou, M.A.; Harmelin, J.-G.; Furnari, G.; Andaloro, F.; Bellou, N.; Streftaris, N.; Zibrowius, H. (2005). Annotated list of marine alien species in the Mediterranean with records of the worst invasive species. Mediterranean Marine Science. 6 (2): 63-118
 Zenetos, A.; Meriç, E.; Verlaque, M.; Galli, P.; Boudouresque, C.-F.; Giangrande, A.; Cinar, M.; Bilecenoglu, M. (2008). Additions to the annotated list of marine alien biota in the Mediterranean with special emphasis on Foraminifera and Parasites. Mediterranean Marine Science. 9(1): 119-165
 Zenetos, A.; Gofas, S.; Verlaque, M.; Cinar, M.; Garcia Raso, J.; Bianchi, C.; Morri, C.; Azzurro, E.; Bilecenoglu, M.; Froglia, C.; Siokou, I.; Violanti, D.; Sfriso, A.; San Martin, G.; Giangrande, A.; Katagan, T.; Ballesteros, E.; Ramos-Espla, A.; Mastrototaro, F.; Ocana, O.; Zingone, A.; Gambi, M.; Streftaris, N. (2010). Alien species in the Mediterranean Sea by 2010. A contribution to the application of European Union's Marine Strategy Framework Directive (MSFD). Part I. Spatial distribution. Mediterranean Marine Science. 11(2): 381-493

hemprichii
Gastropods described in 1869